Compression garments are pieces of clothing that fit tightly around the skin. In medical contexts, compression garments provide support for people who have to stand for long periods or have poor circulation. These come in varying degrees of compression, and higher degree compression sleeves, such as sleeves that provide compression of 20–30 mmHg or higher, typically require a doctor's prescription. Compression garments worn on the legs can help prevent deep vein thrombosis and reduce swelling, especially while traveling.

Compression can also be used for post surgeries, to help with the healing process. Garment usage varies per patient but can be worn up to a year. There is also second stage compression garments, that are every day wear.

In sports, form-fitting compression sportswear, usually made of spandex, is commonly worn by athletes and in exercise to prevent chafing and rashes.

Maternity wear
A bellyband, wrap, or abdominal binder is a compression garment which resembles a tubetop but worn over the abdomen of expectant mothers. Bellybands are also commonly worn post-childbirth to help provide abdominal and back support thereby making it easier to perform day to day tasks, and to help mothers with their posture.

Compression stockings and socks

Compression stockings and socks is hosiery specifically designed to help prevent the occurrence of various medical disorders relating to blood circulation in the legs. They can also be used to halt the progression of these disorders.

Compression gloves 
Compression gloves are handwear designed to help prevent the occurrence of various medical disorders relating to blood circulation in the wrists and hands. They can be used to treat the symptoms of arthritis, though the medical benefits may be limited.

Sportswear

Compression sportswear (shirts, shorts, sleeves, socks or underwear) is usually worn by athletes who wish to enhance performance or recovery speed. Garments are form-fitting garments often made from a spandex-type material.

Depending on the material used and the requirements of the sport, compression garments can be designed to keep athletes cool or warm. For example, speedskaters can wear compression bodysuits on the cold rink, while beach volleyball players can wear a similar-looking suit made of a more breathable, lightweight blend. Both use moisture wicking materials like nylon and spandex in order to keep the garment lightweight.  Additionally, speed skaters can use the aerodynamic nature of wearing a skintight suit to their advantage, while a beach volleyball player has the added benefit of SPF 50+ garments to keep them protected during sunny days. The athletes pictured show some allege benefits that make compression garments popular in a wide range of sports and different designs.

Performance 
Although there are strong claims that compression garments could improve sports performance, methodological approaches and the direction of evidence regarding garments for use in high-intensity exercise settings are diverse and in certain scenarios do not show clear positive evidence.

The conclusion of this 2018 meta-analysis showed that lower-limb compression garments were not associated with improved running performance, vertical jump, VO2max, VO2submax, lactate concentration, or rating of perceived exertion during high-intensity exercise.

Shorts and tights

Compression shorts and tights are usually worn by athletes. They are form-fitting garments and cover the wearer's waist to mid or lower thigh, similar to cycling shorts. They are referred to as spats in Japan and safety shorts in South Korea.

Many are available with a cup pocket, a sewn-in pocket that can hold a protective cup.  It is arguable that compression shorts do not keep cups in the proper position, tight to the body and not moving, as a jockstrap can.  Some male players wear the compression shorts over the traditional jockstrap.

Compression shorts are also popular among female athletes, especially amongst those who wear skirts or kilts during games. In those situations, athletes wear compression shorts under the skirt so if they fall over and their skirts ride up, their underwear will not be exposed. This is seen particularly in women's lacrosse and field hockey (both being limited contact sports in which players often wear skirts). Women also wear compression shorts in tennis, where, most recently, compression shorts have been produced with ball pockets for convenience.

See also
Rugby shorts
Skin-tight garment
Sports clothing
Military anti-shock trousers

References

1990s fashion
21st-century fashion
Hosiery
Medical equipment
Protective gear
Rugby league equipment
Rugby union equipment
Sportswear
Trousers and shorts
Undergarments